Ahaxe-Alciette-Bascassan is a commune in the Pyrénées-Atlantiques department in the Nouvelle-Aquitaine region in southwestern France.

The people of the commune are known as Ahastar.

Geography

Location
Ahaxe-Alciette-Bascassan is part of Cize/Garazi country which was a historical province in Lower Navarre. It includes three former parishes, sometimes counted as four groups of houses in the Middle Ages and with five toponyms: Alciette, Ahaxe, Garatehegi, Ligeta, and Bascassan located at the confluence of the Laurhibar and Esteneko streams.

Alciette is the parish farthest away to the northeast in the combination of the three parishes.

Ahaxe-Alciette-Bascassan is located some 6 km south-east of Saint-Jean-Pied-de-Port and can be accessed by Highway D18 running from close to there through the heart of the commune southeast to Lecumberry.  The village is not on the highway and is left onto the country road Vierge-d'Ahaxe off the D18 heading southeast. There is a country road from Aincille in the west to the village of Bascassin in the commune and there are other country roads entering from the north and the southeast.

Hydrography
The commune is located in the Drainage basin of the Adour, the commune lands are watered by the Laurhibar, a tributary of the Nive, and a tributary of that, the Esteneko stream. The Apatéko stream, a tributary of the Arzubiko stream also crosses the territory of Ahaxe-Alciette-Bascassan.

Localities and hamlets

 Aguerréa
Ahatsaxilo (former parish)
 Ahaxamendy
 Ahaxe
 Alciette
 Bascassan
 Bastida
 Bernetcheko Borda
 Bidartéa
 Bordes (2 places)
 Buirguista
 Buluntza
 Chilinchabidéa
 Chilo
Curutchet (or Garat)
Dorrea
 Errékaldéa
 Erromatéguia (2 places)
 Etcheverria
Garatehegi
 Garatéko Eyhéra
 Gastelua
 Gastalepo
 Haraune
 Harguindéguia
 Idioinea
 Irahane
 Iriberria
 Irigaraya
 Irustikoborda
 Italatzé
Kapila
 Larluzia
 Libiéta
 Lietamendy
Ligeta
 Olherry
 Orido
 Ospitaletchia
 Sagardoyguibel
 Seineguy
 Uhaïtzia
 Urrutia

Toponymy
The commune's name in Basque is Ahatsa-Alzieta-Baskazane.

Ahaxe
The toponym Ahaxe appears in the forms:

Hatce (1167)
Fax (1194)
domine de ahacha (1194)
Assa, Aassa, and Hassa (1249)
Ahatxa (1300)
Ahaxa (1302 Chapter of Bayonne)
Haxa and Ahaxe (1304)
Axa (1309 and 1350)
Hatxa (1350)
Hadssa (1366)
Ahtxe (1703), Visits of Bayonne
Sanctus Julianus Ahaxe (1757, Diocese of Bayonne collections).

Jean-Baptiste Orpustan indicates that the toponym comes from the Basque oronymic base of (h)aitz meaning "rock" or "height".

The people of the commune are called in Basque Ahatsar.

Alciette
The toponym Alciette appears in the forms:

Alsuete (1249)
La Grange Alsuete (1302, Chapter of Bayonne)
Alçueta (1305)
Alzueta (1513, Titles of Pamplona)
Alçuete and Alçueta (1350))
Alchuete (1387)
Alchuette (1387)
Alçueta (1621, Martin Biscay<ref name="Martin Biscay">Derecho de naturaleza que la merindad de San-Juan-del-pie-del-puerto, una de las seys de Navarra, tiene en Castilla - 1622 petit in-4° </ref>)Alsiette (1667, regulations of the States of Navarre)

The Basque name for the people of this area is Alzietar.

According to Jean-Baptiste Orpustan, Alciette is derived from the medieval Alzueta which itself comes from the Basque alzu meaning "place where there are abundant alder trees".

Bascassan
The name Bascassan appears in the forms:Bazquazen (1208)Bascaçen (1292)Bascacen (1350))Bazcacen (1366))Basquacen (1413))Bazcacen (1513, Titles of Pamplona)Vazquacen (1613)Vazcazen and Vazaçan (1621 Martin Biscay)Bascassan (1789)

Its origin is uncertain. The people of the area are called Bazkazandar in basque.Ahaxachillo is mentioned in the 1863 dictionary.)Bastida is also indicated by Raymond.Errékaldéa is mentioned with the spelling Errecaldia referring to the flowing stream of Bascassan flowing into the Laurhibar.

CurutchetCurutchet (also called Garat) was a former fief of Ahaxe, a vassal of the Kingdom of Navarre.

Etcheverria
Paul Raymond mentioned an Etcheberry,  a fief located in the parish of Alciette and a vassal of the Kingdom of Navarre.

Garatehegi
The name Garatehegi appears in the forms:Garateguia (1350)sent jullian et garateheguj (1366)la parropie de garatehegi (1413)Garatteguy (1518, Titles of Pamplona)Garatéhéguy (1708, Regulation of the commander of Irissarry)Garateguy (1863)

Garatehegi from Basque means "summit of the high country".

GasteluaGastelua appears with the spelling Gastellu in 1863.

LibiétaLibiéta is a toponym that appears in the forms:Libiet (1621, Martin Biscay)Libiette (1789)

LigetaLigeta is mentioned in the forms:Lagueta (1264)Ligueta (1307)Liguete (1350), 1366, and 1413).

The origin of this toponym could be the Latin Liger (which was equally likely to be the origin of Loire).

History
The Lordship of Ahaxe, also called the Lordship of Cize, was allied with the Viscounts of Arbéroue in the 11th century as well as the lordships of Guiche and to the Counts of Biscay.

Ahaxe and Alciette-Bascassan were reunited on 11 June 1842.

Heraldry

Administration

List of Successive Mayors of Ahaxe-Alciette-Bascassan

Inter-communality
The commune belongs to seven inter-communal structures:
the Communauté d'agglomération du Pays Basque;
the AEP union of Ahaxe-Lecumberry-Mendive;
the energy union of Pyrenees-Atlantiques;
the RPI (Intercommunal Education) union Hergaray;
the inter-communal union for the development and management of the abattoir of Saint-Jean-Pied-de-Port;
the joint association for the watershed of the Nive;
the union to support Basque culture.

Population

Economy
Economic activity is mainly agricultural. The commune is part of the zone designation of the Ossau-Iraty cheese.

Culture and heritage

Languages
According to the Map of the Seven Basque Provinces published in 1863 by Prince Louis-Lucien Bonaparte, the Basque dialect spoken in Ahaxe-Alciette-Bascassan is eastern low Navarrese.

Civil heritage
There is a gaztelu zahar (a prehistoric fortified complex) at a place called Gaztalepo (Ahaxe), located 550 metres above sea level. There is also a lice or a fence surrounding a fortification running at 313 metres above sea level at a place called Gaztelua or Gastellia. These artifacts represent the ancient past of the commune.

There are several buildings, houses, and farms in the commune that are listed as historical monuments. These are:
Houses and Farms (17th - 19th centuries)
Kapila House
Idioinea farm (17th century)
Gohonetxea farm (17th century) 
Château Saint-Julien (12th century)

Religious Heritage
A number of churches and sites in the commune have been classified as historical monuments. These are:
Parish Church of Saint Julien of Antioch (16th century) The cemetery contains a remarkable collection of Hilarri.

Chapel of Saint-Saveur of Alciette (12th century). The chapel contains several historical objects:
Pulpit (17th century)
2 Benches (17th & 18th century)
Main Altar, Retable and 4 Candlesticks (17th century)
Secondary Altar. Retable, 2 Candlesticks (17th century)
Baptismal fonts (17th century)
Ceiling (17th century)
Statue: Baby Jesus (18th century)
Processional Cross (18th century)
Cross: Christ on the Cross (17th century)
Chapel of Saint-Saveur of Alciette (Interior Decor)
Former benoîterie of Bascassan (18th century).
Former benoîterie'' of Bascassan garden.
Church of Saint-André-de-Bascassan (17th century). The church contains a number of historical objects. These are:
2 Altars, 2 Retables, 2 Paintings, 4 Candlesticks (17th century)
Baptismal fonts (17th century)
Pulpit (17th century)
Processional Cross (18th century)
Cross: Christ on the Cross (17th century)
Bronze Bell (17th century)
Church of Saint-André-de-Bascassan (Interior and Cemetery)
Cemetery Cross of Ahaxe (1827)

Facilities
The commune has a kindergarten.

See also
Communes of the Pyrénées-Atlantiques department

References

External links
Ahaxe-Alciette-Bascassan on Géoportail, National Geographic Institute (IGN) website 
Ahaxe, Alciette, and Bascassan on the 1750 Cassini Map

Communes of Pyrénées-Atlantiques
Lower Navarre